Williams Hall is located on the campus of Miami University in Oxford, Ohio. It is the home of Miami University's Department of Journalism and Department of Communications.

History

Early history 
Williams Hall was constructed in 1959 primarily for the use of the communication department at Miami University and for the use of WMUB studios, Miami’s campus radio broadcasting station. Prior to the completion of Williams Hall, all broadcasting equipment was housed on the second floor of Harrison Hall. After completion of Williams Hall, the classrooms were cramped due to the need to soundproof rooms for WMUB. Also, Williams Hall only had one bathroom in the entire building. This space proved to be too limited for the direction WMUB and Miami University were headed.

Renovation grant 
In 1984, Miami University acquired a state-funded grant to renovate the mass communications department in Williams Hall. The $2.2–million grant was appropriated for renovations and additions to the building. The project involved adding and enlarging classrooms, accumulating more restrooms, and building internal and external accesses for the handicapped. This addition was needed for the increase in students and courses in the communication department since the opening of Williams Hall.

After receiving this grant from the state, Miami University began making plans to complete the project by early 1986. At the same time that construction was happening on Williams Hall, Gaskill, Boyd, and Robertson halls were also being modernized, totaling a $6.5 million renovation. Williams Hall ended up using $3.1 million of this (including the $2.2 million grant) because of changes needed to meet stricter codes.

In addition to enlarging classroom size, Miami also wanted to enhance Williams Hall to look more like a Miami building. They lowered the building to allow for entry at all floor levels. Due to the expansion, the parking lot around Williams was significantly reduced. Additionally, asbestos was removed from the building due to health reasons.

Construction was completed on Williams Hall in time for the 1988-89 school year. The communications department was moved into the building to accommodate the students and faculty in this field. The west side of the building was reserved for the housing of the WMUB studios. WMUB was not moved at the same time Williams Hall was re-opened.  There were complications in wiring and installation of equipment that caused the postponement. Upon completion of Williams Hall, a dedication ceremony took place in 1989. All speakers at the ceremony were alumni of Miami’s mass communication department.

Advertising grant 
In 1988, Miami University again received a federal grant, this time for WMUB-FM from the Corporation for Public Broadcasting for $1,998.  The money was invested in “tune-in” advertising in order to have people tune into the programs by WMUB.

WMUB 
Once WMUB moved to Williams Hall in 1989 the station was ready to go on air. The full history of radio at Miami dates to February 1950, when the first signals were sent from Miami’s Oxford campus. In 1955, WMUB was first moved to Williams Hall. The use of a new public radio satellite system began a new era of audio distribution. Also, professional staff members were added to the WMUB station to assist in teaching communications students. By the next decade, WMUB was focused on representing Miami to the region and the nation as a leading university.

WMUB began to not only partake in radio broadcast, but in the early 2000s added new media, such as web, podcasts and HD Radio to their broadcasts. WMUB became the 7th station in the nation to offer multiple HD streams.

In 2000, WMUB celebrated its 50th anniversary. Miami University organized a sold-out reception at Kettering’s Presidential Banquet Center in Dayton. However, due to economic downturns, in 2009 WMUB had to let go of the progress that had been made and eliminate all WMUB staff in order to continue stability on the Miami campus. The history of WMUB is one that had been held within Williams Hall until recent times. Currently, Miami University retains ownership of the FCC license, but Cincinnati Public Radio Inc. now manages the operation of WMUB as a repeater for WVXU.

Recent history 

Although WMUB studios have been moved from Williams Hall, Miami University has not had a hard time filling the space. Miami’s growing journalism program moved their department into Williams Hall in the fall of 2010. Prior to this, most journalism classes had moved from Bachelor Hall to Williams Hall already. The classrooms and equipment function well for the changing face of journalism as it moves away from print to different mediums.

References 

Buildings and structures of Miami University
Buildings and structures completed in 1959